José Armando Bermúdez National Park is a Dominican Republic National Park spanning the northern slopes and central portions of the Central Mountain Range.

Together with the National Park José del Carmen Ramírez, the two parks were established in February 1956.

Natural history
The range supports the Hispaniolan pine forests ecoregion, of the Tropical and subtropical coniferous forests Biome.

The forests flora of notable biodiversity has many native trees, shrubs, and ferns, including:
 Hispaniolan pine (Pinus occidentalis) — endemic to Hispaniola.
 Pale magnolia (Magnolia pallescens) — tree endemic to Hispaniola, IUCN Red List endangered species.
 West Indian mahogany (Swietenia mahagoni) — endemic to the Caribbean and southern Florida.
 Dominican butterfly bush (Buddleja domingensis) (syn. Buddleja calcicola) — endemic to Hispaniola.

Notes 

National parks of the Dominican Republic
Protected areas established in 1956
IUCN Category II